Sakuraba (written: 桜庭 lit. "cherry blossom garden") is a Japanese surname that may refer to:

Atsuko Sakuraba (born 1976), Japanese gravure idol, tarento and actress
Kazuki Sakuraba (born 1971), Japanese author of novels and light novels
Kazushi Sakuraba (born 1969), Japanese mixed martial artist and professional wrestler
Koharu Sakuraba, manga author
Motoi Sakuraba (born 1965), Japanese composer, arranger, and musician
Nanami Sakuraba (born 1992), Japanese gravure idol, actress and singer

Fictional characters:
Aoi Sakuraba, a fictional character from the manga and anime series Ai Yori Aoshi.
Milfeulle Sakuraba, a fictional character from the anime Galaxy Angel
Neku Sakuraba, a fictional character in the Nintendo DS video game The World Ends with You
Yuichiro Sakuraba, a fictional J-pop Idol in the 2001-2003 drama series Mukodono!

Japanese-language surnames